Ghilad (Banat Swabian: Kilatt) is a commune in Timiș County, Romania. It is composed of two villages, Gad and Ghilad (commune seat). These were part of the commune of Ciacova until 2004, when they were split off.

History 
The first recorded mention of Ghilad dates from 1212, when Andrew II of Hungary donated Gyad to Terra Sebus, responsible for the transfer of possession being the prefect of Csanád, Nicolae Csáky. It was not mentioned in documents until the second half of the 16th century, then it is said that it was inhabited by Romanians, brought from Transylvania by Rami Pasha. In 1717, when the Austrians conquered Banat from the Turks, they conducted a census showing that the locality then called Donji Gilad/Доњи Гилад in Serbian had 100 houses, and a few kilometers away, the locality of Gornji Gilad/Горњи Гилад had 80 houses. Under Empress Maria Theresa, the population of the smaller Ghilad was moved to the larger village. By this time the first Germans had moved here, and in 1842 Hungarian families also settled here. A new wave of Hungarian and German settlers arrived here between 1856 and 1860, mostly from Krassó County. In the interwar period it was part of Plasa Ciacova, Timiș-Torontal County. Until 2004, Ghilad belonged to the commune of Ciacova (now a town), after which it was split off and together with the village of Gad it forms the commune of Ghilad.

The first documentary mentions about Gad are the records of the papal tithes from 1332–1337. Gad is still much older. Traces of Bronze Age habitation have been discovered on the territory of the village. The village was established after the withdrawal of the armies, being named in honor of the duke. An important event for the village took place in 1788, when Emperor Joseph II and Prince Francis, on their way to Belgrade (where a strong Turkish siege was taking place), stopped in Gad, in the house of Petru Miloș. For his hospitality, Petru Miloș was given a purebred stallion from Mezőhegyes. Hungarian historians say that the Serbs from Gad were brought from Montenegro, without mentioning when they came. The coexistence of Romanians with Serbs dates back to ancient times and was also linked to the fact that the two Orthodox communities were in hierarchical communion until 1924. Only in 1929 did Romanians build their own church. In the 19th century it had several owners. The last of these were Hugo and Bela Gudenus, whose mansion (Gudenus Mansion, a historical monument) has been preserved to this day.

Demographics 

Ghilad had a population of 2,078 inhabitants at the 2011 census, up 5% from the 2002 census. Most inhabitants are Romanians (76.32%), larger minorities being represented by Roma (8.47%), Hungarians (7.75%), Germans (2.26%) and Serbs (1.15%). For 3.08% of the population, ethnicity is unknown. By religion, most inhabitants are Orthodox (80.17%), but there are also minorities of Roman Catholics (11.07%) and Pentecostals (3.37%). For 3.46% of the population, religious affiliation is unknown.

Notes

References 

Communes in Timiș County
Localities in Romanian Banat